Sir Arthur Charles Davis, 1st Baronet (1878 – 27 October 1950) was Lord Mayor of London for 1945–46.

See also
Davis baronets

References
https://www.ukwhoswho.com/view/10.1093/ww/9780199540891.001.0001/ww-9780199540884-e-224523

1878 births
1950 deaths
Knights Bachelor
20th-century lord mayors of London
Sheriffs of the City of London
High Sheriffs of Kent